George is a British mass market fashion label founded by George Davies for Asda. It is the second best-selling label in the United Kingdom.

History 
The George brand was founded in 1989 as a partnership between English fashion designer George Davies & Asda. The latter had recruited the high-street designer for its grocery store brand to help shoppers avoid high street.

Asda and George were sold to Walmart in 1999, which led to the expansion of the George brand into Walmart stores. 

In February 2022, Asda and George were bought by TDR Capital for £6.8 billion pounds. Plans to spin George off into an independent brand have been leaked, but those plans have been denied by the acquiring firm.

Reception 
The brand is a success in the UK but ultimately is considered a failure in Canada and the United States.

The brand targeted women aged 30 to 50 when it was rolled out at Walmart. This demographic wasn’t as receptive to the brand in North America as it was in the UK. 

Walmart attempted to fix the issue by targeting a wider demographic by consolidating other labels under one brand. In Canada, this included popular brands such as 725 Originals, B.U.M., and Pennmans. 

By 2018, weak sales forced the brand to shrink to just a menswear line. This only impacted their Canada and US lines, which had been preparing to sell the brand in advance. It was split up into four separate brands under Walmart.

References 

Clothing brands of the United Kingdom
1989 establishments in the United Kingdom
Walmart brands